Garden City is a city in Chatham County, Georgia, United States, located just northwest of Savannah. As of the 2020 census, the city had a population of 10,289. Part industrial and part residential, the city is home to much of the heavy industry in Chatham County. It hosts the largest and busiest ocean terminal of the Port of Savannah, the flagship operation of the Georgia Ports Authority.

Garden City was created in 1939 as Industrial City Gardens, a community intended to house the large workforce required by the new factories and chemical plants just west of downtown Savannah. Garden City is part of the Savannah Metropolitan Statistical Area.

Geography
Garden City is located northwest of the center of Chatham County at  (32.100372, −81.164965). It is bordered to the southeast by the city of Savannah, to the west by the city of Pooler, and to the north by the city of Port Wentworth. To the northeast in unincorporated land is the Port of Savannah and the Savannah River.

Demographics

2020 census

As of the 2020 United States census, there were 10,289 people, 3,221 households, and 1,734 families residing in the city.

2010 census
As of the census of 2010, there were 8,778 people, 3,981 households, and 2,663 families residing in the city. The racial makeup of the city was 49.2% White, 37.4% African American, 0.4% Native American, 1.4% Asian, 0.2% Pacific Islander, 8.9% from other races, and 2.5% from two or more races. Hispanic or Latino of any race were 16.7% of the population.

There were 3,392 households, out of which 27.5% had children under the age of 18 living with them, 36.8% were married couples living together, 20.0% had a female householder with no husband present, and 36.5% were non-families. 29.1% of all households were made up of individuals, and 9.3% had someone living alone who was 65 years of age or older.  The average household size was 2.58 and the average family size was 3.12.

In the city, the population was spread out, with 24.2% under the age of 18, 10.2% from 18 to 24, 28.4% from 25 to 44, 25.4% from 45 to 64, and 11.8% who were 65 years of age or older.  The median age was 35.3 years. For every 100 females, there were 101.3 males.

The median income for a household in the city was $37,264, and the median income for a family was $42,905. Males had a median income of $30,509 versus $30,509 for females. The per capita income for the city was $16,380.  About 15.5% of families and 22.4% of the population were below the poverty line, including 40.6% of those under age 18 and 6.7% of those age 65 or over.

Economy

Agriculture
Located at 701 West U.S. Highway 80, the State Farmers Market is a farmers' market run by the Georgia Department of Agriculture.

Business
Commercial activities are traditionally concentrated near the junction of U.S. Highway 80, U.S. Highway 17 and State Highway 21 (an area once known as Traffic Circle), as well as along Augusta Road (Highway 21), where several long-term-stay hotels, franchise and independently owned fast food restaurants, financial institutions, pawn shops, strip shopping malls, gas stations, car repair shops and automotive retail stores are located. Strip shopping centers include:

Industry
Garden City's industry is located primarily on its waterfront, as is the case for surrounding communities. The Georgia Ports Authority operates a terminal, located at 2 Main Street. Garden City is also home to numerous trucking and railway companies. Other industries are:

Industrial rental space is available at locations such as:

History
From the Reconstruction Era until the 1930s, the area was home to three major plantations: Brampton, Givens and Telfair. Garden City was incorporated on February 8, 1939, as Industrial City Gardens. The name was officially changed to Garden City on March 24, 1941.

Neighborhoods and housing
The oldest inhabited section of Garden City roughly corresponds to the triangle formed by Smith Avenue, State Highway 25 (Main Street) and State Highway 21 corridors. Throughout its history, Garden City has significantly expanded westward and southward. It has acquired several residential subdivisions, which include:

Garden City is home to the following apartment complexes, rental housing units and mobile home parks:

Politics

Municipal

Garden City operated under a mayor–council form of government until 2009. It has adopted a council-administrator style, and by 2011 it will replace its seven at-large council members by one at-large and five district-elected ones.

For a list of past and present mayors and council members of Garden City, see List of mayors of Garden City, Georgia.

As of 2010, Garden City has never collected property taxes.

Other levels of government
Garden City is represented by:

 the 7th and the 8th districts on the boards of the Chatham County Commission and the Savannah Chatham County Public School System
 the 162nd district in the State House
 the 2nd district in the State Senate
 the 1st congressional district in Congress

In the last three decades, the area's county commissioners have been:

Color code:

State representation
The Georgia Department of Corrections operates the Coastal State Prison near Garden City.

Public education

Three public schools can be found within Garden City limits. They are managed by the Savannah Chatham County Public School System.

Groves High School - Long known as "the pride of the Westside", Groves High School has a rich community tradition that dates back to its founding in 1958. Established to serve the young people and families of West Chatham County, the school is named for Robert W. Groves, a prominent business and civic leader in the county. Besides his role in business and his many commercial and community activities, Groves took particular concern for the youth of the area and their educational needs.

Groves High School is home of the Fighting Scottish Rebels football and basketball teams. Campus points of interest include the Woodville-Tompkins Annex, where the automotive and construction programs are offered, and the Cumming Field, named to honor Second Lieutenant Britt C. Cumming, a World War II veteran who was killed in action.

Mercer Middle School serves grades six through eight and is a part of the Savannah Chatham County School System (SCCPSS). Originally called Mercer Junior High School, Mercer Middle School first opened on September 4, 1962, and was the first climate-controlled school in Georgia. Mercer was named for George Anderson Mercer, an attorney who served as the president of the Board of Education from 1883 until his death in 1907.

Garden City Elementary School was built to serve the consolidated student population of the former Benjamin Sprague and Martin G. Haynes elementary schools.

Religion
45.08% of Garden City residents are affiliated with religious congregations. Southern Baptists account for 33% of the population that has a church affiliation, Catholics for 20%, and United Methodists for 15%. There is no Catholic church in Garden City. The nearest is Our Lady of Lourdes Catholic Church, located at 501 South Coastal Highway in Port Wentworth. Local houses of prayer include:

Services

Services to the citizens of Garden City include:

Public parks and recreation
The Garden City Parks and Recreation Department has year-round programs available for citizens. Youth sports include baseball, girls' fast pitch softball, T-ball, football, cheerleading, soccer, gymnastics and basketball. The city also provides non-team activities such as a summer day camp (Camp Eagle), roller skating, after-school programs, and a center for senior citizens. Garden City is home to five public parks. All are managed by the municipal City Parks & Recreation Department, headquartered at 160B Priscilla D. Thomas Way.

Other landmarks
Other landmarks located in Garden City include:

 The Air National Guard facility at 1401 Robert B. Miller Jr. Road
 Coastal State Prison, located at 200 Gulfstream Road and dedicated on May 12, 1981; it replaced the Chatham Correctional Institution as the local-based state-run correctional facility
 The Dotson House (the oldest residence in Garden City), built in 1850 and moved from the surroundings of George A. Mercer School to the site of the current town center
 Fire Department Station No. 1, 160 Main Street
 Fire Department Station No. 2, 2406 U.S. Highway 80 West
 The Order of the Eastern Star's local branch, located at 131 Rommel Avenue
 The county-run Sharon Park Solid Waste Drop-Off Center, located at 50 Kelly Road
 A statue of baseball icon Babe Ruth, which stands on the front lawn of Babe's Barbeque Shack, 525 U.S. Highway 80 West
 Hillcrest Abby West Cemetery, located on Dean Forest Road
 Several roadside welcome signs, posted near the city limits
 Several water towers

References

External links
Garden City official website

Cities in Georgia (U.S. state)
Cities in Chatham County, Georgia
Populated coastal places in Georgia (U.S. state)
Savannah metropolitan area